Children of Mars is a 1943 American short documentary film about child delinquency directed by Frank Donovan. It was part of RKO Pictures' documentary series This Is America. It was nominated for an Academy Award for Best Documentary Short.

References

External links

1943 films
1943 documentary films
1943 short films
1940s short documentary films
American short documentary films
American black-and-white films
Black-and-white documentary films
RKO Pictures short films
1940s English-language films
1940s American films